The 2002 TAC Cup season was the 11th season of the TAC Cup competition. Eastern Ranges have won there 1st premiership title after defeating the Calder Cannons in the grand final by a 1 point thriller.

Ladder

Grand Final

References 

NAB League
Nab League